is a Japanese international badminton player from the Renesas badminton club and later affiliated with Saishunkan team. She participated at the 2008 and 2012 Olympic Games, and also in three Asian Games editions from 2006 to 2014.

Career 
Maeda's first major success was at the 2008 Beijing Olympic Games. With her women's doubles partner Satoko Suetsuna they finished fourth, the 2nd best performance to date by Japanese badminton players at the Olympics. The two have continued to compete together after the Olympics and have maintained a top six ranking since March 2010. On the national level they won their first doubles title in 2010.

In the mixed doubles Maeda competed with Noriyasu Hirata, winning the national championships in 2009 and 2010.

Awards 
In 2010, she received the Valuable Player Award with her partner Satoko Suetsuna at the 2010 Badminton Nihon League.

Achievements

BWF World Championships 
Women's doubles

Asian Championships 
Mixed doubles

BWF Superseries 
The BWF Superseries, which was launched on 14 December 2006 and implemented in 2007, is a series of elite badminton tournaments, sanctioned by the Badminton World Federation (BWF). BWF Superseries levels are Superseries and Superseries Premier. A season of Superseries consists of twelve tournaments around the world that have been introduced since 2011. Successful players are invited to the Superseries Finals, which are held at the end of each year.

Women's doubles

  BWF Superseries Finals tournament
  BWF Superseries Premier tournament
  BWF Superseries tournament

BWF Grand Prix 
The BWF Grand Prix had two levels, the BWF Grand Prix and Grand Prix Gold. It was a series of badminton tournaments sanctioned by the Badminton World Federation (BWF) which was held from 2007 to 2017.

Women's doubles

Mixed doubles

  BWF Grand Prix Gold tournament
  BWF Grand Prix tournament

BWF International Challenge/Series 
Mixed doubles

  BWF International Challenge tournament
  BWF International Series tournament

Record against selected opponents 
Record against year-end Finals finalists, World Championships semi-finalists, and Olympic quarter-finalists.

Satoko Suetsuna 

  Leanne Choo & Renuga Veeran 2–0
  Alex Bruce & Michelle Li 1–0
  Cheng Shu & Zhao Yunlei 0–2
  Du Jing & Yu Yang 0–5
  Gao Ling & Huang Sui 0–1
  Ma Jin & Wang Xiaoli 0–1
  Tian Qing & Zhao Yunlei 0–3
  Wang Xiaoli & Yu Yang 0–5
  Wei Yili & Zhang Yawen 0–2
  Wei Yili & Zhao Tingting 0–2
  Yang Wei & Zhang Jiewen 1–2
  Cheng Wen-hsing & Chien Yu-chin 1–11
  Christinna Pedersen & Kamilla Rytter Juhl 2–3
  Jwala Gutta & Ashwini Ponnappa 4–1
  Vita Marissa & Liliyana Natsir 1–2
  Nitya Krishinda Maheswari & Greysia Polii 1–2
  Mizuki Fujii & Reika Kakiiwa 2–0
  Kumiko Ogura & Reiko Shiota 0–2
  Misaki Matsutomo & Ayaka Takahashi 2–1
  Chin Eei Hui & Wong Pei Tty 4–4
  Valeria Sorokina & Nina Vislova 5–0
  Jiang Yanmei & Li Yujia 0–3
  Lee Hyo-jung & Lee Kyung-won 0–7

References

External links 

 

1985 births
Living people
Sportspeople from Kagoshima Prefecture
Japanese female badminton players
Badminton players at the 2008 Summer Olympics
Badminton players at the 2012 Summer Olympics
Olympic badminton players of Japan
Badminton players at the 2006 Asian Games
Badminton players at the 2010 Asian Games
Badminton players at the 2014 Asian Games
Asian Games silver medalists for Japan
Asian Games bronze medalists for Japan
Asian Games medalists in badminton
Medalists at the 2006 Asian Games
Medalists at the 2014 Asian Games